Deyan Vatchkov (born April 8, 1979) is a Bulgarian bass opera singer.

Vatchkov was born on April 8, 1979 in Sofia, Bulgaria. A Sofia native, he studied vocal technique in the Conservatory of Sofia with professor Karapetrov and later in the Academy of La Scala with Leyla Gencer and Luciana Serra. He won international competitions including the Iris Adami Corradetti's First Prize, the special Arrigo Boito Prize in Padua, and Belvedere's Verdi Prize and Special Chamber Opera Prize. As a result, he made his debut in the role of Don Basilio in Il Barbiere di Siviglia in Wien.

He has performed in Teatro alla Scala, Arena di Verona, La Fenice di Venezia, Giuseppe Verdi di Trieste, Teatro Comunale di Bologna, Teatro di San Carlo, Teatro Regio di Torino, Teatro Carlo Felice in Genoa, Sferisterio Festival di Macerata, Festival Puccini in Torre del Lago, Teatro Real in Madrid, Palau de les Arts di Valencia, ABAO di Bilbao, Amsterdam, Lausanne, Frankfurt, Leipzig, Tokyo, Toronto, Seattle, etc.

References

External links
 Imgartists.com 
 Seattleopera.org
 Nonetwww.naxos.com

1979 births
Living people
Musicians from Sofia
21st-century Bulgarian male opera singers
Operatic basses